Diploglossus delasagra, also known as the Cuban galliwasp, the Cuban pale-necked galliwasp, or la culebrita de cuatro patas (Cuban Spanish: "the little four-legged snake"), is a species of lizard in the family Diploglossidae endemic to Cuba.

Etymology
The specific name, delasagra, is in honor of Spanish botanist Ramón de la Sagra.

Habitat
The preferred natural habitat of D. delasagra is forest, but it is also found in orchards and plantations.

Description
A short-legged species, it is brown dorsally, dark brown to black laterally, and yellowish cream ventrally.

Reproduction
D. delasagra is oviparous.

References

Further reading
Cocteau [J-T], Bibron [G] (1838). "Reptiles " pp. 1–143. In: de la Sagra R (1838). Historia Fisica, Politica y Natural de la Isla de Cuba. Segunda Parte. Historia Natural. Tomo IV. Reptiles y Peces. Paris: Arthus Bertrand. 255 pp. ("SEINCUS [sic]  DE LA SAGRA", new species, pp. 110–114 + Plate XX). (in Latin and Spanish).
Schwartz A, Henderson RW (1991). Amphibians and Reptiles of the West Indies: Descriptions, Distributions, and Natural History. Gainesville: University of Florida Press. 720 pp. . (Diploglossus delasagra, p. 404).
Schwartz A, Thomas R (1975). A Check-list of West Indian Amphibians and Reptiles. Carnegie Museum of Natural History Special Publication No. 1. Pittsburgh, Pennsylvania: Carnegie Museum of Natural History. 216 pp. (Diploglossus delasagra, pp. 118–119).

Diploglossus
Reptiles described in 1838
Reptiles of Cuba
Endemic fauna of Cuba
Taxa named by Jean Theodore Cocteau